Aharon Mordechai Rokeach (born 12 October 1975 [7 Cheshvan 5736]) is the only child — and heir — of the current Rebbe of Belz, Rabbi Yissachar Dov Rokeach. Born in Jerusalem, Israel, he was named after his father's uncle, Rabbi Aharon Rokeach, the fourth Belzer Rebbe, and his father's father, Rabbi Mordechai of Bilgoray.

Family background
Aharon Mordechai was born to Rabbi Yissachar Dov Rokeach and Sarah Hager, daughter of Rabbi Moshe Yehoshua Hager, the future Vizhnitzer Rebbe, after 10 years of marriage. His birth was a cause for great celebration in the Belz Hasidic dynasty, as it meant that the dynasty would continue to be passed down within the Rokeach family line. His father, Rabbi Yissachar Dov, was also an only child, born in 1948 to Rabbi Mordechai of Bilgoray, after the latter's escape from Nazi-occupied Europe with his half-brother, Rabbi Aharon. Rabbi Mordechai died suddenly, a year after his son's birth, and the boy was raised and groomed to be the next Rebbe by his uncle, Rabbi Aharon, who died in 1957. Rabbi Yissachar Dov was crowned Rebbe in 1966.

Biography
Each milestone in Aharon Mordechai's life was celebrated by thousands of Belzer Hasidim. The occasion of his bar mitzvah on 18 October 1988 (7 Cheshvan 5749) prompted a mass gathering of Hasidim in the half-finished Belz Great Synagogue in Jerusalem, followed by a Belzer convention that filled the Jerusalem Convention Center.

On July 7, 1992, Aharon Mordechai was engaged to Sarah Leah Lemberger, daughter of Rabbi Shimon Lemberger, Makova Rebbe in Kiryat Ata. They were married on August 3, 1993, in Kiryat Belz, Jerusalem, in the presence of 6,000 people. The couple has ten sons and three daughters.

Family, eldest son's bar mitzvah, and marriage
The bar mitzvah of Aharon Mordechai's eldest son was also cause for tremendous celebration in Belz. Sholom, named after the first Belzer Rebbe, the Sar Sholom, celebrated his bar mitzvah on 26 February 2008 (27 Adar I 5768). The bar mitzvah tish was conducted by the Belzer Rebbe, in the presence of thousands of Hasidim and dozens of other Rebbes and Torah leaders. As the Belz Great Synagogue was not large enough for the crowd, a giant tent with bleachers was erected out in the courtyard. Festive meals and other events were held for the women in all five halls of the Jerusalem Convention Center.
On 21 May 2013, their eldest son, Sholom Rokeach, married Hannah Batya Peneth (a daughter of Rabbi Yechiel Meir Peneth, one of the Rabbis of the Belzer community in Bnei Brak), in a ceremony at the Belz Great Synagogue that was attended by tens of thousands of guests and well-wishers. A daughter was born to the young couple on 4 May 2014.

Current activities
In the late 2000s, Rokeach began assuming more responsibilities given to him by his father, the Belzer Rebbe. He currently serves as the chairman of the educational board of all Belzer institutions, and makes many fund-raising trips abroad on his father's behalf.

References

External links
Rabbi Aharon Mordechai Rokeach Visits Boro Park (video)
Bar mitzvah of Rabbi Aharon Mordechai Rokeach's eldest son, 2008 (video)

Hasidic rabbis in Israel
Belz (Hasidic dynasty)
Rabbis in Jerusalem
People from Jerusalem
1975 births
Living people